"I Bought a Flat Guitar Tutor" is a song by 10cc appearing on their 1977 album, Deceptive Bends.

The song is quite short and often thought of as a novelty piece amongst fans. The lyrics to the song are all puns for musical terminology. Whenever Eric Stewart sings the name of a chord the chord is played as part of the music to the song. The chart below attempts to explain the complex idea.

I bought A = A major (A C♯ E)
[A] flat = A Flat major (A♭ C E♭)
[A flat] diminished = A Flat diminished (A♭ Cb E♭♭)
Responsibility (responsibilitE)= E Major (E G♯ B)
You're de ninth = D9 (D F♯ A C E)
Person to see = C Major (C E G)
To be suspended = Bsus4 (B E F♯)
in a seventh = A7 (A C♯ E G)
[a seventh] major catastro- = A Major 7th (A C♯ E G♯)
phe = E major (E G# B)
It's a minor = A minor (A C E)
point, but Gee = G major (G B D)
[but gee,] Augmented = G augmented (G B D♯)
[Gee, augmented] by the sharpness of your = G sharp augmented (G♯ B♯ D♯♯)
See what I'm going through (C#) = C# Major
A (A) = A Major
to be (B) = B Major (B D♯ F♯) with you  E major (E G# B)
in a = A Major
[in a] flat = A flat
by the sea = C Major, C Major7, C 7, C & ad g

1977 songs
10cc songs
Novelty songs
Songs about music
Songs written by Graham Gouldman
Songs written by Eric Stewart